William Walter Legge, 5th Earl of Dartmouth (12 August 1823 – 4 August 1891), styled Viscount Lewisham until 1853, was a British peer and Conservative politician.

Political career
Legge was elected in 1849 as Member of Parliament (MP) for South Staffordshire and held the seat until 1853, when he succeeded his father William Legge, 4th Earl of Dartmouth. He was appointed a deputy lieutenant of Staffordshire on 9 October 1852, and Lord Lieutenant of Staffordshire in 1887.

Family
Lord Dartmouth married Lady Augusta Finch, daughter of Heneage Finch, 5th Earl of Aylesford, on 9 June 1846. They had two sons, William Heneage, Viscount Lewisham (1851–1936), and the Hon. Henry Charles (1852–1924), and four daughters, who died unmarried.

Military career
He raised the 27th Staffordshire Rifle Volunteer Corps at Patshull on 7 March 1860 during a French invasion scare, and commanded it in the rank of captain.

Legacy

In 1876, Lord Dartmouth leased 22.7 ha of estate land at Cooper's Hill to the West Bromwich Improvements Commissioners for the creation of Dartmouth Park. Initially the land was rented at a nominal £1 per year for 99 years. Following a design competition that attracted seven entries, the original park scheme was set out by John Maclean of Donnington, Leicestershire, and included a cricket pitch, ornamental water feature and grand carriageway. Dartmouth Park was opened to the public on 3 June 1878 at a cost of £2,500. From 1879 to 1881, West Bromwich Albion F.C. used it as an additional football ground. In 1919, the freehold to the park was awarded to the people of West Bromwich.

Notes

References
 Burke's Peerage, Baronetage and Knightage, 100th Edn, London, 1953.
 Ray Westlake, Tracing the Rifle Volunteers, Barnsley: Pen and Sword, 2010, .

External links 

 

1823 births
1891 deaths
5
Lord-Lieutenants of Staffordshire
Lewisham, William Legge, Viscount
Conservative Party (UK) hereditary peers
Lewisham, William Legge, Viscount
Lewisham, William Legge, Viscount
UK MPs who inherited peerages
Conservative Party (UK) MPs for English constituencies
William
Deputy Lieutenants of Staffordshire
Younger sons of earls